Finn Jensen (1957–2008) was a Danish professional darts player who competed in the 1970s and 1980s.

Career 
He competed in three World Professional Darts Championships, losing in the first round on all three occasions. In 1982, he lost to Cliff Lazarenko. In 1983 he was defeated by the Welshman Tony Ridler in the first round and in 1984 he lost in the same round to Eric Bristow.

In 1979, he won the first of 4 Danish Championships, a record he shares with Frede Johansen.

Jensen died on 11 January 2007 at the age of 49.

World Championship results

BDO 
 1982: Last 32: (lost to Cliff Lazarenko 0–2) (sets)
 1983: Last 32: (lost to Tony Ridler 1–2)
 1984: Last 32: (lost to Eric Bristow 0–2)

External links 
Profile and stats on Darts Database

Danish darts players
British Darts Organisation players
1957 births
2008 deaths
20th-century Danish people